Radio-novinska i izdavačka ustanova "Radio Brčko" Brčko distrikt BiH or RNU "Radio Brčko" is a Bosnian local public radio station, broadcasting from Brčko, Brčko District, Bosnia and Herzegovina. This radio station broadcasts a variety of programs such as music, sport, local news and talk shows. Program is produced in all three official languages of BiH: Bosnian language, Serbian language and Croatian language.

Radio Brčko was launched in 1960 by the municipal council of Brčko and it is the third oldest radio in Bosnia and Herzegovina. In Yugoslavia and in SR Bosnia and Herzegovina, it was part of local/municipal Radio Sarajevo network affiliate.

Estimated number of potential listeners of Radio Brčko is around 273,354.

Due to the favorable geographical position in Bosanska Posavina area, this radiostation is also available in municipalities: 
Orašje, Bosanski Šamac, Modriča, Odžak, Bosanski Brod, Bijeljina, Ugljevik, Lopare, Zvornik, Tuzla, Srebenik, Gradačac, Gračanica, Čelić and in neighboring Croatia (Osijek, Đakovo, Vinkovci, Vukovar, Beli Manastir, Slavonski Brod, Županja, Ilok) and Serbia (Loznica, Šid, Sremska Mitrovica, Bačka Palanka, Šabac).

Frequencies
The program is currently broadcast on 3 frequencies:

 Brčko 
 Udrigovo  
 Skakava Gornja

See also 
List of radio stations in Bosnia and Herzegovina

References

External links 
 www.radiobrcko.ba
 Communications Regulatory Agency of Bosnia and Herzegovina

Brčko
Mass media in Brčko
Radio stations established in 1960